Signed to the Streets 2 is a mixtape by American hip hop recording artist Lil Durk. The mixtapes features production from BackPack, C-Sick, Cardo, Dree The Drummer, Flexx Beats, JPlatinum, LeekeLeek, Murda Beatz, OZ, Squat Beats, Tarentino, The Mekanics, Young Chop and features guest appearances from Ca$h Out, French Montana, Johnny May Cash, Migos and Young Thug. It is hosted by DJ Drama & Don Cannon. It was released on July 7, 2014. Although, the No DJ version was released on July 22, 2014. As of October 31st, 2022, the mixtape has been downloaded over 680,000 times on DatPiff and certified double platinum.

Track listing

References

2014 mixtape albums
Lil Durk albums
Albums produced by C-Sick
Albums produced by Cardo
Albums produced by Murda Beatz
Albums produced by Young Chop
Sequel albums